Pieter Daniel van der Burgh or P. D. van der Burgh (1805–1879) was a Dutch landscape painter.

He was a pupil of his father, Hendrik van der Burgh (1769–1858). He is known for landscapes, but also made portraits and still life paintings.

References

1805 births
1879 deaths
19th-century Dutch painters
Dutch male painters
Artists from The Hague
Dutch landscape painters
19th-century Dutch male artists